Robert Marcel Lepage (born 5 July 1951) is a Canadian musician and film score composer.

Born in Montreal, Lepage trained in music at the age of 20, and learned to play the clarinet and saxophone. He performed with René Lussier and Pierre Hébert during the 1980s and 1990s.

He went on to write the scores for 150 films. He was nominated for the Genie Award for Best Score and the Jutra Award for Best Music for the 2008 film The Necessities of Life.  of La Presse positively reviewed Lepage's score for Iqaluit (2016) as "lyrical". In 2017, Lepage also received a Prix Iris nomination for Best Music for Before the Streets.

References

External links
Robert Marcel Lepage at the Internet Movie Database
Official website

1951 births
21st-century Canadian composers
Canadian clarinetists
Canadian film score composers
Canadian saxophonists
Male saxophonists
Living people
Musicians from Montreal
21st-century saxophonists
21st-century clarinetists
Male film score composers
21st-century Canadian male musicians
Université de Montréal alumni